The North Shore is a township in the Canadian province of Ontario, located in the Algoma District. The township had a population of 497 in the Canada 2016 Census. It is along the north shore of the North Channel of Lake Huron (hence its name), with its main communities all along Highway 17.

Communities

Algoma Mills
Algoma Mills is located between the North Channel and Lauzon Lake, near the township's western boundary with Blind River. The Algoma Mills Water Aerodrome serves the community.

Moiles Mills
Moiles Mills is a ghost town. It was established as a lumber town in April 1889 and burned down in 1918.  The former townsite is now the site of John Island Camp, a children's summer camp operated by the YMCA.

Serpent River
Serpent River is located at the junction of highways 17 and 108.

Spragge

Originally known as Cook's Mills, in 1882 the Cook Brothers Lumber Company established a sawmill at this location on the north shore of Lake Huron. The mill operated until 1906 when it was sold to Waldie Brothers Lumber Company. With the mill no longer in Cook's ownership, Spragge (the original name of the township in which it is located), was adopted as the name of the community.  Waldie Brothers in turn sold the mill to McFadden and Malloy in 1913.

Over time a small village with a school, hotel, barbershop, general store was created, and by 1926 the community had a population of about 300 people.  Sawmill activity was terminated in Spragge in the early 1930s following a disastrous fire, which eliminated the mill, lumber inventory, docks and most of the town. The town subsequently revived with the discovery of uranium and copper deposits in the area, leading to a thriving mining industry.

Demographics 

Population trend:
 Population in 2016: 497
 Population in 2011: 509
 Population in 2006: 549
 Population in 2001: 544
 Population in 1996: 678
 Population in 1991: 729

Images

See also
List of townships in Ontario
List of francophone communities in Ontario

References

External links

Municipalities in Algoma District
Single-tier municipalities in Ontario
Township municipalities in Ontario